Zoja Aleksandrovna Golubeva (née Sadovskaya; born 30 April 1967) is a Soviet, Belarusian and Latvian draughts player in international draughts. She was Women's World Champion in 1986, 1988, 1990–1992, 1994–2000, 2013, 2015, 2017. She became 16-time champion after winning in 2017; she was also Women's European Champion (2010 and 2012). Zoja Golubeva was also the winner of the International Draughts tournament at the 1st World Mind Sports Games. She is one of the highest ranking women in international draughts.

In 1988, Golubeva married and moved to Latvia. She has a twin, Olga Sadovskaya, who is a Belarusian draughts player.

Sports achievements

World Championship

Notes

References

External links
World Championship Women 1973 - 2011
Profile, FMJD
Profile, KNDB

1967 births
Living people
Latvian draughts players
Soviet draughts players
Players of international draughts
Belarusian draughts players